The Lithophylloideae are a monophyletic subfamily of Corallinaceaen Coralline algae with uniporate conceptacles.

References

Bikont subfamilies
Corallinaceae